Milano–Modena was a single-day road bicycle race held annually in Umbria, Italy from 1906 to 1955. It was held as an individual time trial in 1928 and 1931.

Winners

References

Cycle races in Italy
Classic cycle races
Recurring sporting events established in 1906
1906 establishments in Italy
1955 disestablishments in Italy
Recurring sporting events disestablished in 1955
Defunct cycling races in Italy